Takalani Sesame ("be happy Sesame" in Venda) is the South African co-production of the children's television program Sesame Street, co-produced by Sesame Workshop and South African partners. The series debuted in 2000 and currently airs on SABC 2.

Content 
According to Sesame Workshop, Takalani Sesame is a "uniquely South African interpretation of the Sesame model, engaging children and their parents and promoting basic school readiness, literacy, numeracy, and health and hygiene." Takalani Sesame also has a special focus on HIV/AIDS awareness and seeks to introduce HIV/AIDS safety while promoting tolerance and reducing stigma. The Takalani series also includes a popular radio program, a newspaper and magazine comic strip series, and a national campaign which encourages adults to talk to their children about HIV/AIDS and related issues.

The show incorporates all of South Africa's 11 official languages: Afrikaans, English, Zulu, Xhosa, Swazi, Ndebele, Sesotho, Northern Sotho, Tsonga, Tswana and TshiVenda.

Characters
The series features a number of muppet characters. Kami, an HIV-positive five-year old muppet, joined the show in its third season in 2002.

Basma and Jad, who both originated on Ahlan Simsim, debuted on Takalani in its thirteenth season.

Other muppet characters include Elmo (named "Neno" from 2000 to 2016, or sometimes 2019), Grover, Kupukeji, Moshe, Zikwe, and Zuzu.

Guests 
Archbishop Desmond Tutu, Kofi Annan, and Nane Annan have made guest appearances on the show.

Season 13 featured guest appearances from celebrities like Jason and Nicholas Goliath, David Kau, Sho Madjozi and Holly Rey.

Episodes

Season 11 of the show was scheduled to begin on 1 June 2020 on South African television channel SABC 2.

Season 12 played from 7 June 2021 to 3 December 2021 at 15:30 weekdays on SABC 2. Season 12 currently repeats weekdays at 07:00 on SABC 1. Season 12 currently repeats on Mondays & Saturdays at 05:00 & Mondays at 16:30 on S3.

Season 13 started on 6 June 2022 on SABC 2 at 15:30 and will run for 130 episodes. Season 13 currently repeats weekdays @ 07:00 on SABC 1. Season 13 currently repeats on Mondays & Saturdays @ 05:00 on S3.

List of episodes 
 Season 1 (September 2000 – March 2001)
 The Muppets sing "Doing the Family Thing" (2000)
 The Muppets see the importance of exercise in "What I Can Do" and "Mika Skipping Rope" (2000)
 The song "That's what friends are for" explores the qualities of a friend (2000)
 Zikwe writes a "book about me" (2000)
 Takalani Sesame is holding a party about food (2000)
 In "Sunrise to Sunset", we see the movement of the sun during the day; a farmer plants corn and waits for rain (2000)
 The Muppets learn that whenever we talk about transport we must also talk about safety; a bird helps a monkey get bananas (2000)
 This is what my body can do (2000)
 The children look at some special things that they can make or do (2000)
 Children make their own elephant masks for a performance (2000)
 Children greet each other in 11 languages (2000)
 A little boy's sister has HIV and learns coping strategies (2000)
 Losing things, looking for them and finding them are at the heart of this show (2001)
 This show looks at different feelings and how we can express these feelings (2001)
 Zuzu and Moshe share memories of toys they used to have; combing your hair can be fun (2001)
 In a song we learn that insects are part of the circle of life (2001)
 The Muppets and the children learn that everything and everybody needs water (2001)
 In this show we see the Muppets busy with activities that need persistence and concentration; an ant works around an obstacle in his path (2001)
 Zikwe and Zuzu use a telescope to look at the moon (2001)

Awards 
In late 2022 the program was nominated for an Annual Kidscreen Award in the Preschool Programming category.

Controversy
The introduction of an HIV-positive Muppet, Kami, to increase awareness of HIV/AIDS was widely criticised by the U.S. political right, with such groups as the American Family Association seeing it as a means for LGBT activists to influence young viewers.

References

External links

 Official Website
 IMDb - Takalani Sesame
Sesame Workshop Website
 Kami formally appointed by the UN as a global champion for children
 An HIV-positive muppet

2000 South African television series debuts
2003 South African television series endings
2007 South African television series debuts
2009 South African television series endings
Sesame Street international co-productions
South African Broadcasting Corporation television shows
South African children's television series
South African television shows featuring puppetry
South African television series based on American television series